This is the complete list of Asian Winter Games medalists in curling from 2003 to 2017.

Men's team

Women's team

External links
 World Curling Federation

Curling
medalists